Marat Safin defeated Pete Sampras in the final, 6–4, 6–3, 6–3 to win the men's singles tennis title at the 2000 US Open. It was his first major title.

Andre Agassi was the defending champion, but lost in the second round to Arnaud Clément. 

The tournament was notable for the first major main draw appearance of future world No. 1 and US Open champion Andy Roddick, and the first US Open main draw appearance of future world No. 1 and five-time US Open champion Roger Federer.

Seeds
The seeded players are listed below. Marat Safin is the champion; others show the round in which they were eliminated.

  Andre Agassi (second round)
  Gustavo Kuerten (first round)
  Magnus Norman (fourth round)
  Pete Sampras (finalist)
  Yevgeny Kafelnikov (third round)
  Marat Safin (champion)
  Thomas Enqvist (fourth round)
  Àlex Corretja (third round)
  Lleyton Hewitt (semifinalist)
  Cédric Pioline (third round)
  Tim Henman (third round)
  Juan Carlos Ferrero (fourth round)
  Franco Squillari (second round)
  Nicolas Kiefer (quarterfinalist)
  Mark Philippoussis (second round)
  Nicolás Lapentti (second round)

Qualifying

Draw

Finals

Top half

Section 1

Section 2

Section 3

Section 4

Bottom half

Section 5

Section 6

Section 7

Section 8

External links
 Association of Tennis Professionals (ATP) – 2000 US Open Men's Singles draw
2000 US Open – Men's draws and results at the International Tennis Federation

2000 US Open (tennis)
US Open (tennis) by year – Men's singles